This is a list of the seasons played by Feyenoord from 1909 when the club first participated in competition, the club was established in 1908, to the most recent seasons. The club's achievements in all major national and international competitions as well as the top scorers are listed. The list is separated into two parts, coinciding with the two major episodes of Dutch football:

Before 1956 the Dutch league structure was changing with several divisions. In 1956 the Eredivisie, the highest tier in Dutch football, started.
Since 1956 a nationwide league, the Eredivisie, exists.

Feyenoord have won the Netherlands Football League Championship/Eredivisie fifteen times; twn of them in the Eredivisie. The club also won the KNVB Cup thirteen times. Feyenoord won three European titles: the 1969–70 European Cup, the 1973–74 UEFA Cup and the 2001–02 UEFA Cup. They also won the 1970 Intercontinental Cup. The club have never been relegated from the Eredivisie.

Key

Key to league record:
Pld – Matches played
W – Matches won
D – Matches drawn
L – Matches lost
GF – Goals for
GA – Goals against
Pts – Points
Pos – Final position

Key to rounds:
Prel. – Preliminary round
Q1 – First qualifying round
Q2 – Second qualifying round, etc.
Inter – Intermediate round (between qualifying rounds and rounds proper)
GS – Group stage
1R – First round
2R – Second round, etc.
R64 – 1/32 Final (round of 64)
R32 – 1/16 Final (round of 32)
R16 – 1/8 Final (round of 16)
QF – Quarter-final
SF – Semi-final
F – Final
W – Winners
DNE – Did not enter

Key to competitions
 JCS – Johan Cruyff Shield
 EC – European Cup (1955–1992)
 UCL – UEFA Champions League (1992–present)
 CWC – UEFA Cup Winners' Cup (1960–1999)
 UC – UEFA Cup (1971–2009)
 UEL – UEFA Europa League (2009–present)
 UECL – UEFA Europa Conference League (2020–present)
 USC – UEFA Super Cup
 IC – Intercontinental Cup
 RVB – Rotterdamse Voetbal Bond
 NVB – Nederlandse Voetbal Bond
 KNVB – Koninklijke Nederlandse Voetbal Bond

Seasons until 1956

Seasons from 1956 to now

References 

 
 
 
 
 
 
 

 
Feenoord